Aliaksei Mikalayevich Nichypar (born 10 April 1993) is a Belarusian athlete specialising in the shot put. He represented his country at the 2017 World Championships without qualifying for the final.

His personal bests in the event are 20.52 metres outdoors (Minsk 2017) and 20.40 metres indoors (Mogilyov 2018).

International competitions

References

1993 births
Living people
Belarusian male shot putters
World Athletics Championships athletes for Belarus